Regel nr. 1 (aka: Rule No. 1) is a 2003 Danish feature film directed by Oliver Ussing. It has a running time of 87 minutes.

This romantic comedy was produced by Zeitgeist in association with Zentropa.

It stars Susanne Juhász as a young single woman, Caroline, who is continually receiving advice from her sister, Sarah (Mira Wanting), with disastrous results. She eventually realises she has to find her own way through life.

It was nominated for three Robert awards (the Danish Oscar):
Best Actress: Susanne Juhász
Best Cinematography: Morten Søborg
Best Supporting Actor: Nicolas Bro

Sources 
Remix at IMDb

External links 
 
 Review in Berlingske Tidende
 Review in Politiken

2003 films
Danish romantic comedy films